The Monuments aux Morts of the Eastern Somme are French war memorials commemorating those who died in World War I on the eastern side of the Somme region.

Monuments aux Morts of the Eastern Somme

Gallery

See also
World War I memorials
War memorials (Aisne)
War memorials (Oise)
War memorials (Western Somme)

References

External links 
 Sites of Memory (Historical markers, memorials, monuments, and cemeteries worldwide)
 A National Archives article giving further information on the memorial at Dormans which is dedicated to the First and Second Battles of the Marne
 A further National Archives article dealing with the Villers-Bretonneux Australian Memorial
 FranceGenWeb-Source of information on monument aux morts 

Sculptures in France
World War I memorials in France

fr:Monument aux morts